Arthit Kamlang-ek (31 August 1925 – 19 January 2015;) was a Thai general. He was the Commander-in-Chief of the Royal Thai Army from 1982 to 1986 and parallel the Supreme Commander of the Royal Thai Armed Forces from 1983 to 1986. He was particularly influential during the 1980s during the government of Prem Tinsulanonda.

Education and early career
Arthit graduated from the Chulachomklao Royal Military Academy.  He later attended the Royal Thai Army's Staff College.

Family
General Arthit has two sons, one daughter and one stepson. His youngest son, Titiwat Kamlang-ek, has two children: Peerawut Kamlang-ek and Athittaya Kamlang-ek.

1981 Young Turk coup
General Arthit was a leader of the counter-coup against the Young Turk coup of 1981.  Afterwards, he was promoted to Commander of the First Army Region, traditionally regarded as the most strategic post for coups and counter-coups.

Clash with Prem
General Arthit's subsequent rapid rise to the post of Commander-in-Chief of the Royal Thai Army in October 1982 was unprecedented.  Also serving as the Supreme Commander starting September 1983, General Arthit at times challenged the propriety of key government policies. In November 1984, for example, he made a televised condemnation of the government's currency devaluation policy. Also in 1984, apparently with General Arthit's blessing, some active-duty and retired army officers pressed for constitutional amendments aimed at enhancing their political influence. A showdown between Arthit's camp and Prem's ruling coalition was narrowly averted when General Arthit urged the officers to abandon the amendments.

General Arthit also played a role in the 1985 election which brought Chamlong Srimuang to the governorship of Bangkok.  Arthit urged his subordinates and their families to vote against any party that had an anti-military orientation, particularly the Democrats.

Downfall
In 1986, General Arthit lobbied vigorously to extend his term as Army Commander another year to September 1987, which would allow him to retain influence after the expiration of Prem's term as Prime Minister.  But on March 24, 1986, the government announced that Arthit would be retired as scheduled on September 1, 1986.  Then on 27 May, Prem stunned the nation by dismissing Arthit from his position as Army chief and replacing him with General Chaovalit Yongchaiyut, a Prem loyalist.  Prior to that, no Army Chief had ever been fired. This unprecedented action came amid the flurry of rumours that the general was involved in behind-the-scenes manoeuvres to undermine Prem's chances for another premiership after the July 1986 parliamentary elections. General Arthit, whose largely ceremonial post as Supreme Commander of the Royal Thai Armed Forces until September 1986 was not affected by the dismissal order, denied any role in such maneuvers.

Post-military career
In early 1991, Arthit was appointed by Prime Minister Chatichai Choonhavan as Deputy Defense Minister.  Early rumors of his appointment seriously angered many military leaders, especially Army chief Suchinda Kraprayoon and his former classmates from the 5th Class of the Chulachomklao Royal Military Academy.  A military coup led by Suchinda and the National Peace Keeping Council soon overthrew Chatichai's government.

Honour

 1982 -  Knight Grand Cordon of the Most Exalted Order of the White Elephant
 1981 -  Knight Grand Cordon of the Most Noble Order of the Crown of Thailand
 1983 -  Knight Grand Commander of the Most Illustrious Order of Chula Chom Klao
 1990 -  Knight Commander of the Honourable Order of Rama
 1995 -  Order of Symbolic Propitiousness Ramkeerati
 1969 -  Victory Medal - World War II
 1952 -  Victory Medal - Korean War
 1973 -  Victory Medal - Vietnam War, with flames 
 1982 -  Freemen Safeguarding Medal (First Class)
 1982 -  Border Service Medal
 1959 -  Chakra Mala Medal 
 1981 -  King Bhumibol Adulyadej's Royal Cypher Medal, 3rd

Foreign honour
  : 
1984 -  Honorary Commander of the Order of the Defender of the Realm (P.M.N.) 

 
1984 -  Grand Cross 1st Class of the Order of Merit of the Federal Republic of Germany

Footnotes

1925 births
2015 deaths
Arthit Kamlang-ek
Arthit Kamlang-ek
Arthit Kamlang-ek
Arthit Kamlang-ek
Arthit Kamlang-ek
Arthit Kamlang-ek
Arthit Kamlang-ek
Arthit Kamlang-ek
Arthit Kamlang-ek
Arthit Kamlang-ek
Arthit Kamlang-ek
Arthit Kamlang-ek
Arthit Kamlang-ek
Arthit Kamlang-ek
Arthit Kamlang-ek